Vang Moua (born 1979) is a French/Chinese Hmong people kickboxer. He is a former Sanda Rules Europe Champion and France Champion many times. Moua amassed an Amateur Sanshou record of 89–10.

Biography and career 
Vang Moua is a pro kickboxer and member of the France team of Sanshou, he has received various titles such as Champion of France by 2 times, and he is also a European and World champion in the discipline. He trains at Moua top team  in Limoges.

Titles and accomplishments 
 Professional:
 Kickboxing
 -2005 Kickboxing K-1 Rules French Champion
 -2009 French Kickboxing Class A Champion 
 -2010 French Kickboxing Class A Champion
 Sanshou
 -11 times French Champion
 -2002 European Champion
 -IKF 2002 Intercontinental Champion
 Amateur:
 2003 World Wushu Championships - Men's sanda, Macau, China  (-65 kg)
2007 World Championship Champion

Kickboxing and Muay Thai record 

|-  bgcolor="#FFBBBB"
| 2018-06-09 || Loss ||align=left| Aiman Al Radhi || La Nuit De l'Impact IV || Saintes, France || Decision || 3 || 3:00 
|-  bgcolor="#FFBBBB"
| 2018-01-06 || Loss ||align=left| Geoffrey Vivies || Niglo Fighting Championship || La Grande-Motte, France || Decision || 3 || 3:00 
|-  bgcolor="#FFBBBB"
| 2017-12-02 || Loss ||align=left| Hasan Toy || Mix Fight Gala 23 || Frankfurt, Germany || Decision || 3 || 3:00 
|-  bgcolor="#CCFFCC"
| 2017-10-19 || Win ||align=left| Kader Marouf || Partouche Kickboxing Tour || La Tour de Salvagny, France || Decision || 3 || 3:00
|-  bgcolor="#CCFFCC"
| 2017-09-23 || Win ||align=left| Karim Jabri || Extreme Fight For Heroes 5 || Draguignan, France || KO || 1 || 
|-  bgcolor="#FFBBBB"
| 2017-09-04 || Loss ||align=left| Samir Mohamed || Tiger Night || Cologny, Switzerland || Decision || 3 || 3:00 
|-  bgcolor="#FFBBBB"
| 2017-06-22 || Loss ||align=left| Yannick Reine || Triumph Fighting Tour || Paris, France || TKO || 2 ||  
|-  bgcolor="#FFBBBB"
| 2017-05-20 || Loss ||align=left| Elam Ngor || Glory of Heroes: Spain & Strikers League || Tenerife, Spain || Decision || 3 || 3:00 
|-  bgcolor="#FFBBBB"
| 2017-04-30 || Loss ||align=left| Cedrick Peynaud || Superfight Boxing Art Tournament || Clichy, France || Decision || 3 || 3:00 
|-  bgcolor="#FFBBBB"
| 2016-12-09 || Loss ||align=left| Charlie Peters || Enfusion Live Abu Dhabi || Abu Dhabi, UAE || TKO || 2 ||  
|-  bgcolor="#CCFFCC"
| 2016-12-09 || Win ||align=left| Ayoub Ahmamou || Enfusion Live Abu Dhabi || Abu Dhabi, UAE || Ex.R TKO || 4 ||  
|-  bgcolor="#FFBBBB"
| 2016-11-05 || Loss ||align=left| Cedric Castagna || Glory 35 Nice || Nice, France || Decision || 3 || 3:00 
|-  bgcolor="#FFBBBB"
| 2016-06-03 || Loss ||align=left| Rayan Mekki || Phenix Boxing Only Edition 4 || Saint-Julien-en-Genevois, France || Decision || 3 || 3:00 
|-  bgcolor="#FFBBBB"
| 2016-04-23 || Loss ||align=left| Philippe Salmon || Simply The Boxe - Space Edition || La Penne-sur-Huveaune, France || Decision || 3 || 3:00 
|-  bgcolor="#FFBBBB"
| 2016-03-12 || Loss ||align=left| Olivier Lagarigue || Glory 28 Paris || Paris, France || Decision || 3 || 3:00 
|-  bgcolor="#CCFFCC"
| 2016-01-30 || Win ||align=left| Mohamed Karbale || Championnat du Monde de K1 || Paris, France || KO || 1 ||  
|-  bgcolor="#FFBBBB"
| 2015-07-18 || Loss ||align=left| Walid Haddad || Partouche Kickboxing Tour || Aix-en-Provence, France || KO || 2 ||  
|-  bgcolor="#CCFFCC"
| 2015-04-25 || Win ||align=left| Nabil Abou Taha || La Nuit De La Boxe Thai Et Du Full Contact || Saint Quentin, France || Decision || 3 || 3:00 
|-  bgcolor="#FFBBBB"
| 2014-06-27 || Loss ||align=left| Crice Boussoukou || Strike Fight || Lyon, France || KO || 1 || 
|-  bgcolor="#CCFFCC"
| 2014-06-05 || Win ||align=left| Mohamed Jelassi || Mionnay || Mionnay, France || KO || 2 ||  
|-  bgcolor="#FFBBBB"
| 2014-05-10 || Loss ||align=left| Johny Tancray || Boxe-Thai - Championnat d'Europe || Nice, France || Decision || 3 || 3:00 
|-  bgcolor="#FFBBBB"
| 2014-04-12 || Loss ||align=left| Eddy Nait Slimani  || Simply The Boxe || La Penne-sur-Huveaune, France || Decision || 3 || 3:00 
|-  bgcolor="#FFBBBB"
| 2014-02-01 || Loss ||align=left| Mohamed Kariche || Shock Muay 6 || Saint-Denis, France || KO || 2 || 
|-  bgcolor="#FFBBBB"
| 2013-11-15 || Loss ||align=left| Daniel Manzoni  || Muaythai League || Paris, France || Decision || 3 || 3:00 
|-  bgcolor="#FFBBBB"
| 2013-10-11 || Loss ||align=left| Willy Borrel || Warriors Night || Issy les moulineaux, France || KO || 2 || 
|-  bgcolor="#CCFFCC"
| 2013-06-28 || Win ||align=left| Cedrick Peynaud || Gala Team Carcharias || Perpignan, France || Decision || 3 || 3:00 
|-  bgcolor="#CCFFCC"
| 2013-04-27 || Win ||align=left| Arthur Siong || Fight Night Round 1 || Couzeix, France || Decision || 3 || 3:00 
|-  bgcolor="#FFBBBB"
| 2013-04-14 || Loss ||align=left| Desty Beaubrun  || WICKED ONE Tournament #2 || Paris, France || Decision || 3 || 3:00 
|-  bgcolor="#FFBBBB"
| 2013-01-19 || Loss ||align=left| Modibo Diarra  || Championnat d'Europe et du Monde de K1 || Meaux, France || Decision || 3 || 3:00 
|-  bgcolor="#FFBBBB"
| 2012-12-15 || Loss ||align=left| Hafed Romdhane || Championnat du Monde K1 rules || Saint-Raphaël, France || KO || 1 || 
|-  bgcolor="#FFBBBB"
| 2012-11-24 || Loss ||align=left| Charles Francois || Nuit des Champions 2012 || Marseille, France || Decision || 3 || 3:00 
|-  bgcolor="#CCFFCC"
| 2012-06-22 || Win ||align=left| Juan Martos || Gala Du Carcharias || Perpignan, France || Decision || 3 || 3:00 
|-  bgcolor="#CCFFCC"
| 2012-05-12 || Win ||align=left| Brian Denis || WICKED ONE Tournament semi final || Paris, France || KO || 2 ||  
|-  bgcolor="#CCFFCC"
| 2012-05-12 || Win ||align=left| Samir Bourhaleb || WICKED ONE Tournament quarter final || Paris, France || Ex.R Decision || 4 || 3:00  
|-  bgcolor="#CCFFCC"
| 2012-04-14 || Win ||align=left| Murvin Babajee || Fight Zone VI || Villeurbanne, France || KO || 2 ||  
|-  bgcolor="#FFBBBB"
| 2011-10-01 || Loss ||align=left| Abdellah Ezbiri || F-1 World Max Tournament 2011 semi final || Meyreuil, France || Decision || 3 || 3:00 
|-  bgcolor="#CCFFCC"
| 2011-10-01 || Win ||align=left| Ibrahim Konate || F-1 World Max Tournament 2011 quarter final || Meyreuil, France || Decision || 3 || 3:00 
|-  bgcolor="#FFBBBB"
| 2011-06-25 || Loss ||align=left|  Hysni Beqiri || Superpro Fightnight || Bâle, Switzerland || Decision || 3 || 3:00 
|-  bgcolor="#CCFFCC"
| 2011-06-18 || Win ||align=left| Hamid Naceur || Carcharias || Perpignan, France || KO || 2 ||  
|-  bgcolor="#CCFFCC"
| 2011-04-30 || Win ||align=left| Kichima Yattabare || Finales Championnat de France de Kick-Boxing ||Paris, France || Decision || 3 || 3:00 
|-  bgcolor="#CCFFCC"
| 2011-04-02 || Win ||align=left| Atef Bahedi || 1/2 Finales Championnat De France Kick Boxing || Strasbourg, France || Decision || 3 || 3:00 
|-  bgcolor="#CCFFCC"
| 2010-06-19 || Win ||align=left| Mohamed El Aouaji || Finales du Championnat de France Elites de Kick-Boxing || Paris, France || TKO || 3 || 
|-  bgcolor="#FFBBBB"
| 2009-06-26 || Loss ||align=left| Abdellah Ezbiri || 1er Gala International Multi-boxes || Paris, France || Decision || 5 || 3:00 
|-  bgcolor="#FFBBBB"
| 2009-04-25 || Loss ||align=left| Abdellah Ezbiri || Finales du Championnat de France de Kickboxing || Paris, France || Decision || 3 || 3:00 
|-  bgcolor="#FFBBBB"
| 2008-11-08 || Loss ||align=left| Nizar Galas || Championnat d'Europe : Peynaud VS Orrela || Paris, France || Decision || 3 || 3:00 
|-  bgcolor="#FFBBBB"
| 2008-03-08 || Loss ||align=left| Abdellah Ezbiri || Quarts De Finale Championnat De France || Paris, France || Decision || 3 || 3:00 
|-
|-
| colspan=9 | Legend:

See also 
 List of male kickboxers

References 

1979 births
Living people
French male kickboxers
French sanshou practitioners
French Muay Thai practitioners
Hmong people